Mayer House may refer to:

in the United States
(by state then city)
Maxwell F. Mayer House, Little Rock, Arkansas, NRHP-listed
Donovan-Mayer House, Helena, Montana, NRHP-listed in Lewis and Clark County
S. C. Mayer House, Cincinnati, Ohio, NRHP-listed
Mayer-Banderob House, Oshkosh, Wisconsin, NRHP-listed in Winnebago County

See also
Meyer House (disambiguation)
Mayer Apartments, Mayer, Arizona, NRHP-listed in Yavapai County
Mayer Business Block, Mayer, Arizona, NRHP-listed in Yavapai County
Mayer Red Brick Schoolhouse, Mayer, Arizona, NRHP-listed in Yavapai County
Mayer Boot and Shoe Company Building, Milwaukee, Wisconsin, NRHP-listed in Milwaukee